Narinder Singh (born 4 July 1954) is an Indian former cricketer. He played first-class cricket for Bengal, Haryana and Railways.

See also
 List of Bengal cricketers

References

External links
 

1954 births
Living people
Indian cricketers
Bengal cricketers
Haryana cricketers
Railways cricketers
Cricketers from Kolkata